Anthony Dwane Mackie (born September 23, 1978) is an American actor. Mackie made his film debut starring in the semi-biographical drama film 8 Mile (2002). He was later nominated for the Independent Spirit Award for Best Actor for his performance in the LGBT drama Brother to Brother (2004), and in the same year, appeared in psychological thriller The Manchurian Candidate and the sports film Million Dollar Baby. Mackie starred in Half Nelson (2006); in 2008, Mackie both appeared in the action thriller Eagle Eye, and was nominated for the Independent Spirit Award for Best Supporting Actor for his performance in The Hurt Locker. He portrayed Tupac Shakur in Notorious (2009), and later starred in Night Catches Us (2010), and The Adjustment Bureau and Real Steel (both 2011).

He achieved global recognition for portraying Sam Wilson / Falcon / Captain America in the Marvel Cinematic Universe, beginning with the film Captain America: The Winter Soldier (2014), and most recently starring in the Disney+ miniseries The Falcon and the Winter Soldier (2021); he is set to lead his own film titled Captain America: New World Order (2024). During this period, Mackie also starred in the period crime film Detroit (2017), The Hate U Give (2018), the horror film Synchronic (2019), and The Banker (2020).

Away from film, Mackie has performed in Broadway and Off-Broadway adaptations, including Ma Rainey's Black Bottom, Drowning Crow, McReele, A Soldier's Play and Carl Hancock Rux's Talk, for which he won an Obie Award in 2002. Mackie portrayed Martin Luther King Jr. in the HBO television film All the Way (2016), and portrayed Takeshi Kovacs in Netflix series Altered Carbon (2020).

Early life
Mackie was born on September 23, 1978, in New Orleans, Louisiana, the son of Martha (née Gordon) and Willie Mackie Sr., a carpenter who owned a roofing business, Mackie Roofing. His brother, Calvin Mackie, is a former associate professor of engineering at Tulane University who now works at the Louisiana Recovery Authority. Mackie attended Warren Easton Sr High School and the New Orleans Center for Creative Arts (NOCCA) and graduated from the high school drama program at the North Carolina School of the Arts (NCSA) in 1997. He later graduated from the Juilliard School's Drama Division as a member of Group 30 (1997–2001), which also included actors Tracie Thoms and Lee Pace.

Career

In 2002, Mackie worked as an understudy to Don Cheadle in Suzan-Lori Parks' play Topdog/Underdog and won an OBIE Award for his role in Carl Hancock Rux's play Talk. He appeared in the 2002 film 8 Mile as the main antagonist, Papa Doc. His first starring role in a feature film was the 2003 independent film Brother to Brother, where he played Perry, a young artist who struggles to adjust to the world as a gay black man. The following year, Mackie appeared in Million Dollar Baby, which won the Academy Award for Best Picture, and starred in Spike Lee's She Hate Me. In 2006, Mackie starred in Half Nelson, Crossover, and We Are Marshall.

In March 2008, Mackie starred in three plays by playwright August Wilson at the John F. Kennedy Center for the Performing Arts in Washington DC: Ma Rainey's Black Bottom, Fences, and Jitney – all part of "August Wilson's 20th Century", a month-long presentation of ten staged readings of Wilson's "Century Cycle". Mackie has participated several times in the "24-Hour Plays" held in New York City each fall. In mid-2009, he played the role of Pentheus in the New York City Public Theater's Shakespeare in the Park production of The Bacchae. He starred with Christopher Walken in A Behanding in Spokane on Broadway in February 2010.

Mackie portrayed late American rapper Tupac Shakur in the 2009 film Notorious. He had previously portrayed Shakur in the play Up Against the Wind in 2001, while attending Juilliard. In 2009, he appeared in The Hurt Locker. Mackie also narrated The Best That Never Was, a documentary about football player Marcus Dupree. He appeared in the 2011 film The Adjustment Bureau as Harry Mitchell, a sympathetic member of a shadowy supernatural group that controls human destiny. Mackie co-starred, as Sam Wilson / Falcon, in the Marvel Studios sequel Captain America: The Winter Soldier (2014). He reprised the role in multiple Marvel Cinematic Universe films over the next several years, including 2015's Avengers: Age of Ultron and Ant-Man, 2016's Captain America: Civil War, 2018's Avengers: Infinity War, and 2019's Avengers: Endgame.

In 2016, Mackie portrayed Martin Luther King Jr. in the HBO TV drama All the Way. In 2018, Mackie appeared as gang leader King in The Hate U Give, a film adaptation of the bestselling novel of the same name. In 2019, Mackie had a role in the Netflix science-fiction film, IO.

In July 2018, it was announced that Mackie was cast in the role of Takeshi Kovacs for the second season of Netflix's science-fiction series, Altered Carbon. In March 2019, it was announced that Mackie was cast in the fifth season of Netflix's science-fiction anthology series, Black Mirror. The following month, Disney confirmed a Marvel television series starring Mackie and Sebastian Stan, called The Falcon and the Winter Soldier, would be aired on their upcoming Disney+ streaming service, debuting on March 19, 2021. Mackie starred in and produced the science fiction film Outside the Wire which was released by Netflix on January 15, 2021. In August 2021, Mackie closed the deal to reprise the role in Captain America 4.

In January 2022, it was announced that Mackie will helm the drama film Spark, starring Saniyya Sidney, as his directorial debut project. In February 2022, he was set to lead action film Ending Things along with Priyanka Chopra Jonas, directed by Kevin Sullivan and star in a live-action series adaptation of the game Twisted Metal at Peacock. In 2022, it was announced Mackie would be attached to a film based on the 1956 Sugar Bowl which feature's his brother's Alma mater Georgia Tech.

Personal life
In 2014, Mackie married his long-time girlfriend and childhood sweetheart Sheletta Chapital. They divorced in 2018. The couple has four children together.

Mackie opened a bar called NoBar in Bed-Stuy, Brooklyn in the summer of 2011. He had plans to open a second NoBar in Williamsburg, Brooklyn in 2013, but closed all NoBar locations in 2015.

In November 2013, Mackie was arrested for driving while intoxicated after he was initially stopped by police for having tinted windows, which is illegal in New York. He was pulled over at 1:22 a.m., officers noticed an odor of alcohol and observed that Mackie had bloodshot eyes, He was fined $300, ordered to complete a drunk driving program and was banned from the road for 90 days in New York state for the violation.

On The Kelly Clarkson Show, Mackie revealed that he is dyslexic.

Filmography

Film

Television

Video games

Theme park attractions

Stage

Awards and nominations

References

External links

 

1978 births
Living people
21st-century American male actors
African-American male actors
American male film actors
American male television actors
American male video game actors
American male voice actors
Juilliard School alumni
Male actors from New Orleans
University of North Carolina School of the Arts alumni
21st-century African-American people
20th-century African-American people
Actors with dyslexia